Deer Valley YMCA Camp is a YMCA summer camp located between Fort Hill, Pennsylvania and Meyersdale, Pennsylvania. It sits on 742 acres of mountainous lands near Mount Davis, the highest peak in Pennsylvania, and includes 125-acre Deer Valley Lake. Deer Valley operates ten months out of the year and offers summer camp experience to families and various organizations from all around the country.

History 
The land that Deer Valley currently occupies belonged to the family of Howard G. Peck from about the time of the Revolutionary War. In the year of 1931 Curtis Howe "Doc" Springer came from Florida to open a health resort. He purchased and constructed his resort on the Peck property. The "health resort" was said to be a place where one could get an abortion, back when it used to be illegal, creating much camp folklore. “Haven of Rest” was a free resort, running solely on donations. Springer was forced to close the resort in 1937 when the cost of construction resulted in money problems. The land was reverted to Howard Peck. Soon after, Captain Colon B. Harris rented the land and the winter resort “Ski Trains” was born. This resort became well known throughout the late 1930s among the neighboring states. But in the year 1938 Harris left to take a job in Washington DC, and due to the poor health of Howard Peck, resulted in the sale of the Deer Valley property to The Independent Order of Odd Fellows (I.O.O.F.). The I.O.O.F had plans to open a vacation spot for families but due to disagreements forfeited the land back to Howard Peck. During this time a group of six men purchased the land. They named the new company “Deer Valley Inc” and went about constructing a large 125-acre lake on the property. Deer Valley Inc. tried to sell the property to the Boy Scouts but was unsuccessful. The Director of Camping Services for the Pittsburgh YMCA Thomas Reid Alexander was then introduced to the property by his son, Thomas Reid Alexander Jr. On December 30, 1952 the YMCA of Pittsburgh purchased the property and is still the current owner. Thomas Reid Alexander Sr, his Wife Gladys, their children Molly and Thomas ran the camp at Deer Valley, until Thomas Reid Alexander's death in 1966.

In 1957 Deer Valley YMCA Family Camp opened for the first season of family camp. This first summer the camp served 838 campers, during an eight-week season. In 1972 the camp underwent construction to winterize the facilities to become a year-round experience and now operates 10 months out of the year.

Campers 
Since 1993 the camp has been running at full capacity and has a 93% return rate of campers. The campers range in age with family members of all ages. It is very common for the families who camp at Deer Valley to have deep roots there and some have as much as four generations of family camping tradition!

Staff 
The camp is currently directed year round by James Pointer whose family also lives at Deer Valley year round. The summer staff is generally  college-aged adults and the majority of these young adults were campers themselves at Deer Valley growing up. The camp also employs staff from other countries through their international program. They also have a volunteer program available to high school aged students, known as the Rising Leaders Program. Within the program, students going into their junior year of high school can work as SALTs (Service and Leadership Training), and students going into their senior year can work as CLIPpers (Camp Leadership Instructional Program).

Currently 
The camp currently has around forty cabins, two shower houses, a program lodge which includes a very popular snackbar and a craftshop, waterfront, campfire circle, dining hall, a horse barn, zip line, high ropes course, an archery and pellets range, a multipurpose hall, and many sports fields and facilities. Families generally camp for seven-day sessions in the summer, as well as Memorial Day weekend. Deer Valley was featured on the news program The Today Show in the summer of 2010.

Features 
Deer Valley Lake and Waterfront 
Craft shop
Snackbar
Dining hall
Nature Center
Archery and BB Range
Hiking trails

Legends 

The White Lady

Deer Valley has countless tales dating back to when the Pecks owned the property until today. One of the tales is of the White Lady. On her wedding day way back when, tradition kept it so that the groom could not see the bride until the ceremony. She was making her journey to the church separate, when her carriage got into an awful accident, resulting in her death. Her fiancé waited at the church, but his bride never showed. This made him depressed beyond belief, and he hung himself in the Peck family rabbit hutch. In that rabbit hutch, they say that the rope would swing back and forth, until it was taken apart. The wood was used in places around camp, heavily within the waterfront, where they say the canoes will all point to the rabbit hutch if taken down at night. To this day, there are reportings of the White Lady proving herself to be a good spirit. For example, a young boy got lost deep in the woods at camp and was found at the top of a tall tree. There was absolutely no possible way that the boy could have gotten up there himself, and when he was brought down he told of a "White Lady" saving him from a bear.

Tom Storm

It was a cool Autumn weekend at camp. Deer Valley was hosting a group of Indian Princesses and their dads. Amidst it all, a car slinked into camp. Whoever was in charge at the time went over to the car to investigate. The driver said that he was a bounty hunter, and spoke of an escapee from a local prison by the name of Tom Storm. He told of the fact that Tom Storm was considered dangerous as well as a known child molester. He emphasized that there was no real reason to disturb the whole camp, but that he wanted to check all of the facilities out.

References

External links 
YMCA of Greater Pittsburgh

Campgrounds in Pennsylvania
Buildings and structures in Somerset County, Pennsylvania
YMCA Summer Camps
1957 establishments in Pennsylvania